In mathematics, the Kontsevich quantization formula describes how to construct a generalized ★-product operator algebra from a given arbitrary finite-dimensional Poisson manifold. This operator algebra amounts to the deformation quantization of the corresponding Poisson algebra. It is due to Maxim Kontsevich.

Deformation quantization of a Poisson algebra

If one were given a Poisson manifold , one could ask, in addition, that

Two deformations are said to be equivalent iff they are related by a gauge transformation of the type,

where  are differential operators of order at most . The corresponding induced -product, is then 

For the archetypal example, one may well consider Groenewold's original "Moyal–Weyl" -product.

Kontsevich graphs
A Kontsevich graph is a simple directed graph without loops on 2 external vertices, labeled f and g; and  internal vertices, labeled . From each internal vertex originate two edges. All (equivalence classes of) graphs with  internal vertices are accumulated in the set .

An example on two internal vertices is the following graph,

Associated bidifferential operator
Associated to each graph , there is a bidifferential operator  defined as follows. For each edge there is a partial derivative on the symbol of the target vertex. It is contracted with the corresponding index from the source symbol. The term for the graph  is the product of all its symbols together with their partial derivatives.

The term for the example graph is

Associated weight
For adding up these bidifferential operators there are the weights  of the graph . First of all, to each graph there is a multiplicity  which counts how many equivalent configurations there are for one graph. The sample graph above has the multiplicity .

In order to compute the weight we have to integrate products of the angle in the upper half-plane, H, as follows.

This is

The integration domain is Cn(H) the space

The formula amounts
,
where t1(j) and t2(j) are the first and second target vertex of the internal vertex .

The formula
Given the above three definitions, the Kontsevich formula for a star product is now

Explicit formula up to second order

References

Mathematical quantization